Master Romi (born Mohammed Salim) is a former Indian actor in Hindi language films. He was best known as a child actor after his brilliant performance in K.A. Abbas’s film “Munna” released in 1954. “Munna”, the first songless Hindi movie was screened for a select audience including India's first Prime Minister Jawaharlal Nehru. Nehru was so moved by child star Master Romi’s performance that he invited him for breakfast the next morning along with entire unit.

Career
He made his screen debut in Sohrab Modi’s “Jhansi Ki Rani” and later played important roles in “Shole,” “Footpath,” “Dil-e-Nadaan,” “Paapi”, “Toote Khilone” and Hum Panchhi Ek Daal Ke.

In 1958, a Hindi film adaptation called Do Phool (Two Flowers) was released based on the Swiss literary novel/ icon Heidi. The role of Heidi – called Poornima in the film – was played by Baby Naaz who was one of the most famous child stars at the time along with Master Romi.

Filmography

References

External links
 

Male actors in Hindi cinema
Place of birth missing
20th-century Indian male actors